Ladies Mile is a   Local Nature Reserve to the east of Patcham, on the northern outskirts of Brighton in East Sussex. The area was designated in 2003 and is owned and managed by Brighton and Hove City Council.

It is a remarkable survival of plateau chalk grassland on Downland where almost all such flattish sites have been allocated to modern farming. The ancient turf of Ladies Mile has been preserved and there are lots of odd linear banks which are surviving fragments of an Iron Age and Romano-British lynchetted field system. The banks once stretched across the line of the bypass, beyond which one or two more fragments also survive. At the eastern end of the Down is a Bronze Age burial mound recognisable only by a low, grassy tump.

This grassland site  is rich summer flowers and has extensive areas of horseshoe vetch and kidney vetch. Harebell, Sussex rampion flower, rockrose and yellow rattle are enjoyed by locals here and at midsummer there are still good numbers of glowworms. Later in the summer months the violet-blue of devil’s-bit scabious and the powder-blue lesser scabious radiate. There are also areas of scrub and a wood at the southern end.

There is access from Ladies Mile Road.

References

Local Nature Reserves in East Sussex